Shroud is a 2002 novel by John Banville. It is the second book in the Alexander and Cass Cleave Trilogy, which also contains the novels Eclipse, published in 2000, and Ancient Light, published in 2012.

Plot summary
Axel Vander, famous man of letters and recently widowed, travels to Turin to meet a young woman called Cass Cleave.  Cleave is a literary researcher who has discovered two secrets about Vander's early years in Antwerp. The first is that, in the years prior to World War Two, Vander contributed some anti-Semitic articles to a right-wing newspaper, and secondly, that he is not Axel Vander at all. He is Vander's childhood friend; he appropriated Vander's name and identity after the man disappeared and was presumed dead.

Background
The novel is partly inspired by two scandals concerning eminent academics that occurred in the 1980s: the posthumous discovery of anti-Semitic texts written during World War II by literary critic Paul de Man, who had an influential postwar career in the United States; and the murder by Louis Althusser of his wife Hélène Legotien. Althusser was a well-known Marxist philosopher.

Banville has said that this is one of his favourite novels—"a dark, hard, cruel book", one in which he came closest to achieving what he set out to write at the start of the writing process. He also noted that "Everybody hated Shroud—even, I think, the people who admired it. It was favorably reviewed, but it was not and is not a book a reader could readily love. Shroud is my monstrous child whom I cherish but who horrifies others."

Colm Tóibín has stated that the book ought to have won Banville the Booker Prize.

References

2002 Irish novels
Novels about writers
Novels by John Banville
Picador (imprint) books